Kuybyshev is a rural locality (a settlement) and the administrative center of Kuybyshevskoye Rural Settlement, Sredneakhtubinsky District, Volgograd Oblast, Russia. The population was 2,468 as of 2010. There are 44 streets.

Geography 
Kuybyshev is located on the right bank of the Akhtuba River, 6 km south of Srednyaya Akhtuba (the district's administrative centre) by road. Srednyaya Akhtuba is the nearest rural locality.

References 

Rural localities in Sredneakhtubinsky District